Polish National Government (Polish: Rząd Narodowy) can refer to:
 Polish National Government (November Uprising) (1831)
 Polish National Government (Kraków Uprising) (1846)
 Polish National Government (January Uprising) (1863–1864), also known as Temporary National Government for part of that period
 Polish National Government (Vienna) (1877)